The Man Who Loved Redheads is a 1955 British comedy film directed by Harold French and starring Moira Shearer, John Justin and Roland Culver. The film is based on the play Who is Sylvia? (1950) by Terence Rattigan, which is reputedly a thinly veiled account of the author's philandering father. The film follows the play fairly closely, its main difference being the turning of Sylvia into a redhead.

The film contains a ballet sequence featuring extracts from The Sleeping Beauty, which was decorated by Loudon Sainthill.

Plot
Young peer and junior member of the Foreign Office, Mark St. Neots (John Justin), is obsessed with the memory of Sylvia (Moira Shearer), a 16-year-old redhead he met at a party as a boy, and vowed he would love forever. Now older and respectably married, Mark still retains his image of the beautiful young girl with the red hair, and spends the rest of his life searching for her, through a string of casual affairs.

Cast
 Moira Shearer - Sylvia / Daphne / Olga / Colette
 John Justin  - Mark St. Neots, Lord Binfield
 Roland Culver - Oscar
 Gladys Cooper - Caroline, Lady Binfield
 Denholm Elliott - Dennis
 Harry Andrews - Williams
 Patricia Cutts - Bubbles
 Moyra Fraser - Ethel
 John Hart - Sergei
 Joan Benham - Chloe
 Jeremy Spenser - Young Mark
 Melvyn Hayes - Sydney
 Kenneth More - Narrator (voice)

Production
The film was the last movie from director Harold French:
I didn't like that - I didn't enjoy making it, or seeing it. I got on all right with Moira but I didn't think she was quite strong enough. I felt we were under-cast. You couldn't meet a nicer man than the leading man, John Justin, but I really wanted Kenneth More. But it wasn't a very good play and Terry did the screenplay as well. Of course Gladys Cooper steals the whole thing in the last few minutes... I quarrelled with Korda about it. I had a clause in my contract with him that he wasn't to come on the set, but he did come a few times and suggest very old fashioned ideas. His days as a great producer were pretty much over by then and he was tired.

Critical reception
In a contemporary review, The New York Times wrote, "With the aid of an expert cast and a director endowed with a deft, comic touch and a high regard for the subtleties of the English language, Mr. Rattigan and the producers have created a charming lark, light as a zephyr and just as welcome these days," before singling out Moira Shearer, who "In essaying the roles of the 'redheads,' has developed acting talents that are both surprising and refreshing". The Evening Standard wrote of the film, "it's featherweight, but it's fun". TV Guide called it "An engaging British comedy". Sky Cinema found it "Sometimes witty but often dated," concluding that "The film's attitudes to class do it little credit, but there is compensation in a string of cameo roles played with real dry wit: Harry Andrews' butler, Joan Benham's model, Patricia Cutts' good time girl, Moyra Fraser's sardonic Ethel and, perhaps best of all, Gladys Cooper as a wife of long experience who has all the answers."

References

External links
 

1955 films
1955 comedy films
British comedy films
British films based on plays
Films directed by Harold French
Films scored by Benjamin Frankel
Films with screenplays by Terence Rattigan
1950s English-language films
1950s British films